The Jawaharlal Institute of Postgraduate Medical Education & Research (JIPMER) (originally known as Institut Jawaharlal de formation et de recherche médicales postdoctorales) is a medical school located at Pondicherry, the capital of the Union Territory of Puducherry, in India. JIPMER is an Institute of National Importance (INI) and a tertiary care referral hospital. It is under the direct administrative control of the Ministry of Health and Family Welfare, and Indian Government, with autonomy to run its internal administration. JIPMER is an Institute of National Importance and a tertiary care referral hospital.

JIPMER currently has over 300 faculty members, over 700 resident physicians and over 800 nursing, administrative and support staff. It admits 249 undergraduate students and 200 postgraduate students annually.

History 

1823: The erstwhile French India established the L'Ecole de Médecine de Pondichéry to train French citizens in Pondichéry. It was one of the earliest institutions of tropical medicine and the teaching staff consisted of surgeons and doctors of the French navy and troupes coloniales. Students who were trained here were granted a diploma called Médicin Locale that allowed them to practice medicine in the colonial territories. The college then was located in the heart of the Pondicherry, opposite Le place de Gaulle, which is now the Legislative Assembly Hall.

1956: Following the de jure transfer of Puducherry to India in 1956, the Government of India took over the college and renamed it as Medical College, Pondicherry. For a short period, this was also called the Dhanvantri Medical College.

1959: The foundation stone for a new medical college building was laid at Gorimedu, on the outskirts of the town by SE Le Comte Stanislas Ostrorog, Ambassadeur de France aux Indes,

1964: Dhanvantari Medical College moved to Gorimedu, to a new campus called Dhanvantari Nagar.

1964: The institution was given its current name in honour of India's first Prime Minister Pandit Jawaharlal Nehru, as  "Jawaharlal Institute of Postgraduate Medical Education and Research" (JIPMER), on 13 July 1964, by Dr Sarvepalli Radhakrishnan, the then President of India.

1966: The main hospital block was inaugurated and the blood bank was commissioned, signalling the shift of all clinical services to the new campus.

1973: The Central Library was inaugurated

1975: The National Teacher Training Centre was established at JIPMER marking the beginning of JIPMERs involvement in training generations of medical teachers across the country.

1995: The Department of Cardiology started a Cardiac Catheterization Lab to provide interventional cardiology services.

2000: The Emergency and Trauma block was inaugurated.

2001: A separate Administrative Block was inaugurated to consolidate all offices spread across the hospital campus.

2002: The Department of Radiotherapy was upgraded as a Regional Cancer Centre. The centre now includes the Departments of Radiotherapy, Medical Oncology, and Surgical Oncology.

2006: JIPMER College of Nursing was inaugurated and started functioning.

2008: JIPMER was upgraded as an Institution of National Importance by an act of Indian Parliament.

2009: The Super Specialty Block started functioning, initially providing services from Cardiothoracic Surgery, Cardiology, Urology, and Plastic Surgery

2012: Paediatric, Obstetric and Gynaecology services moved into the JIPMER Women and Children's Hospital, which was inaugurated by Dr Manmohan Singh, the then Prime Minister of India.

Campus
The campus of JIPMER lies at the western entrance of Pondicherry and spreads across  of a hillock known locally as Gorimedu.

The campus contains the medical college, the old and new hospital blocks, student and resident hostels, staff quarters, a Kendriya Vidyalaya, a branch each of two nationalized banks, two ATM's, a post office, a temple, the Dr. APJ Abdul Kalam JIPMER Auditorium playgrounds and sporting fields.

Organization and administration 

The institute is headed by the Director, who is the chief executive charged with the overall responsibility of running the institute and its hospital. The Medical Superintendent helps the Director coordinate all the hospital functions pertaining to patient care. Dean (Academic) is charged with overseeing and coordinating all the academic activities of the institute including teaching, whereas Dean (Research) looks after all the research-related activities.

Principals of Dhanvantri Medical College/JIPMER, Pondicherry 

 Leon Lapeyssonie—first Principal
 S Vengsarkar
 D Jagannath Reddy
 Bala Subramanian
 DB Bisht

Directors of JIPMER
 MN Ghosh—first Director
 OP Bhargava
 P Bahadur
 S Chandrasekar
 DS Dubey
 Deepak Ruhil
 KB Logani
 PH Ananthanarayanan (first JIPMER alumnus to become director of the institute)
 KSVK Subba Rao 
 TS Ravikumar
 Subhash Chandra Parija
 Vishnu Bhatt
 Vivekanandam
 RP Swaminathan
 Rakesh Aggarwal

Regional Cancer Centre 
The Department of Radiotherapy at JIPMER was converted to a Regional Cancer Centre in 2002. , the Regional Cancer Centre has two departments housed in a new building, namely Radiotherapy and Medical Oncology. Advanced radiation treatment facilities, ranging from 3D conformal radiation and IMRT to Image-guided Radiation Therapy (IGRT) are available. Basic radiation facilities, such as 2D Cobalt and LINAC, HDR brachytherapy are available free to all cancer patients. Further, most of the commonly used high-cost chemotherapy drugs are also supplied free. Recently, Bone Marrow Transplantation is also being practised in this centre. 
RCC, JIPMER is the only hospital in southern India to provide free cancer treatment, as is also done for other advanced medical services, such as pulmonary medicine, nephrology, gastroenterology etc.

Academics

Since its designation as an Institute of National Importance, JIPMER is a university by itself, and awards its own degrees. Prior to that, it was affiliated to Pondicherry University. JIPMER offers a number of medical, nursing and paramedical courses at the undergraduate and postgraduate levels. Admissions to all the courses are based on merit.

The institute conducts research in modern medicine, public health and medical education. A research council at the institute level oversees the research activities and a scientific society provides a forum for presenting research work. Numerous conferences, workshops, seminars and training courses are conducted by the institute every year. Funds for research come from intramural and extramural sources such as the ICMR, UGC, DBT, WHO, etc. The institute's faculty, residents and students regularly publish research papers in journals of national and international repute and research abstracts at national and international conferences.

Courses

JIPMER offers a variety of courses. Undergraduate courses include MBBS, B.Sc. (Medical Laboratory Technology), B.Sc. (Allied Medical Sciences - Cardiac Lab Technology / Dialysis / Neuro / OT), BMRSc (Bachelor of Medical Record Science). B.Sc. (Nursing) was started in 2006. Postgraduate courses include MDS,MD, MS, and diploma in many specialties, M.Sc. in nursing, Medical Biochemistry and Medical Physiology  and PhD in several subjects. Super-specialty courses include MCh in Surgical Oncology, Cardiothoracic & vascular surgery, Urology, Neurosurgery, Plastic surgery, Paediatric surgery, Surgical gastroenterology  and DM in Cardiology, Neurology, Nephrology, Neonatology, Clinical pharmacology, Clinical immunology and Endocrinology. In January 2014 JIPMER started master's in public health(MPH) course, Emergency Medical Technician course MRO and MRT.

Admission

Candidates to the courses offered at JIPMER are selected based on All-India level entrance tests NEET and INI-CET. Entrance examinations are held once a year for undergraduate seats and twice a year for post-graduate seats. Calls for applications and results of these examinations (including the names of selected candidates) are announced in major national newspapers as well as on the institute's website.

MBBS course

JIPMER currently admits 249 students to the MBBS course once every year through an all-India entrance examination. Some seats are reserved for Puducherry natives and Central Government nominations. Of these seats, 187 are for the Puducherry campus and 62 are for its Karaikal campus, which started in 2016.

Postgraduate courses
Three-year postgraduate courses offered at JIPMER include MD in General Medicine, Emergency medicine, Nuclear Medicine, Radiation Oncology, Obstetrics & Gynaecology, Pathology, Forensic Medicine, Microbiology, Physiology, Pharmacology, Paediatrics, Anaesthesiology, Dermatology, Biochemistry, Community Medicine, TB & RD and Psychiatry and MS in General Surgery, Orthopaedic Surgery, Obstetrics and Gynaecology, Ophthalmology, Oto-Rhino-Laryngology and Anatomy. The entrance examination i.e., INI-CET has been launched since year 2020 conducted twice a year for postgraduate courses in may and in November.

Super Specialty Courses

Three year super-specialty courses are offered in Medical (DM) and Surgical (MCh) specialties. They include Cardiology, Cardio-Thoracic Surgery, Neurology, Neuro Surgery, Nephrology, Urology, Medical and Surgical Gastroenterology, Medical Oncology, Surgical Oncology, Neonatology, Clinical Pharmacology, Clinical Immunology and Endocrinology.

PhD

PhD candidates are admitted to many departments like Public Health, Pharmacology, Biochemistry, Immunology, Microbiology etc. Admissions are based on an entrance examination conducted once every year.

Other courses
B.Sc. Nursing.
Four years professional course. Admissions are based on entrance exams.

BSc (Medical Lab Technology) and BSc (Allied Medical Sciences - Cardiac Lab, Anesthesia, OT, Dialysis and Neuro-Technology courses) 3 year. Admissions are based on entrance exams.

MSc (Medical Biochemistry and Medical Physiology). Admissions are based on entrance exams.

Rankings

JIPMER was ranked third among government medical colleges in India in 2022 by Outlook India and eighth among medical colleges in India by the National Institutional Ranking Framework (NIRF) in 2020.

Ongoing developments
JIPMER has started the work of its second super-specialty block (SSB-II), JIPMER International School of Public-health. Institute is partnering with other institutions, including Harvard School of Public Health, to exchange faculty, educational tools, research and data on public health. JIPMER's tie-up with the Harvard School of Public Health is part of the larger MoU between the American Medical School and  Indian Ministry of Health and Family Welfare. JIPMER has also started the works of offsite hospital in Karaikal.

Telemedicine 
The Telemedicine Services Centre of JIPMER started collaboration with Seoul National University Bundang Hospital (SNUBH), South Korea and has started using Trans-Eurasia Information Network (TEIN). Since, JIPMER is a Member of TEIN Network, the hospital can interact and share knowledge with European and Asian Countries. On 15 February 2016 the personnel of JIPMER interacted over Video Conferencing using TEIN Network with Seoul National University Bundang Hospital (SNUBH) South Korea. JIPMER thus became the first centre to use the Telemedicine services for the purpose. The Trans-Eurasia Information Network (TEIN) uses the ICT technologies to increase regional cooperation with Asian countries and to bridge the digital divide among less developed regions. It connects universities and research institutions with high capacity Internet network to increase the exchanges of knowledge among them and make big international research projects real.

Student life

Student’s union

The students union is the "JIPMER Students Association" (JSA). Representatives of the student body are elected annually in a campus-wide election. A similar, albeit smaller, body exists for the postgraduate students and residents and is called the JIPMER Resident Doctors’ Association (JRDA).

Alumni groups

JIPMER alumni, especially those who have graduate from the MBBS course, have formed several alumni communities and organizations.
 The largest is an online virtual community called Jipmernet where alumni from all over the globe are active participants.
 The oldest alumni organization is the JIPMER Alumni Association (JAA) that organizes an annual meet the first weekend of August at JIPMER that is attended by alumni from India and abroad.
 Regional alumni organizations include the JIPMER Alumni Association of North America (JAANA), the JIPMER Alumni Association of the United Kingdom (JAAUK) and the JIPMER Alumni Association of North India (JAANI).

Alumni
 Paramasivam Natarajan, photochemist, Shanti Swarup Bhatnagar Prize (1984) awardee
 K R Balakrishnan, heart surgeon, performed the first permanent artificial heart transplant in India with HeartMate II LVAD

See also
 List of medical colleges in India
 List of medical schools
 Medical college in India
 Postgraduate Institute of Medical Education and Research
 Sanjay Gandhi Postgraduate Institute of Medical Sciences

References

External links

Medical and health sciences universities in India
Medical colleges in Puducherry
Universities and colleges in Pondicherry (city)
Research institutes in Puducherry
Medical Council of India
Medical research institutes in India
Regional Cancer Centres in India
Educational institutions established in 1823
1823 establishments in India
Academic institutions formerly affiliated with the University of Madras
1820s establishments in French India
Educational institutions established in 1964
Research institutes established in 1964
1964 establishments in Pondicherry